William Winfield Scott (February 1855 in Pennsylvania – October 1, 1935 in New Jersey) was a lawyer and the official historian of Passaic, New Jersey.

References

1855 births
1935 deaths
People from Passaic, New Jersey
New Jersey lawyers